In algebra, a Cohen ring is a field or a complete discrete valuation ring of mixed characteristic  whose maximal ideal is generated by p. Cohen rings are used in the Cohen structure theorem for complete Noetherian local rings.

See also 
Norm field

References
 Cohen's paper was written when "local ring" meant what is now called a "Noetherian local ring". 

Commutative algebra